Serena Gail Dalrymple (born September 7, 1990) is a Filipino-American actress who has been officially retired from show business since 2004, though she twice briefly returned to star in the 2008 film Ang Tanging Ina Ninyong Lahat and in the 2010 film Ang Tanging Ina Mo (Last na 'To!). During her career, she played roles in a number of movies and television series, largely with ABS-CBN.

Early life and education
Dalrymple was born to Robert Lloyd Dalrymple, a Scottish American and a former military officer, and Wilma Billones-Dalrymple.  She attended high school at the O. B. Montessori Center in Las Piñas, from which she graduated on March 29, 2007. She then went on to study export management at the De La Salle-College of Saint Benilde and aimed to attend university in the United States.

Dalyrmple obtained a Masters in Business Administration from Hult International in 2014.

Career
Dalrymple began her career in show business in 1997 after her famous television commercial of Jollibee "Isa pa-isa pang chicken joy". Her acting skills earned her minor roles in some movies, through which she began to receive wider recognition.

Her first movie, Haba-baba-doo, Puti-puti-poo! which aired in 1998, brought her alongside fellow child actress Camille Prats. Following appearance, she was given a role in Tong Tatlong Tatay Kong Pakitong-kitong, which was released that same year. The following year she starred in three movies: Type Kita, Walang Kokontra, Tik Tak Toys My Kolokotoys, and Wansapanataym. After participating in subsequent movies, she began to star in television series in 2001.

The first, entitled Sa Dulo Ng Walang Hanggan, featured co-star Claudine Barretto, and lasted from 2001–2003. While doing that series, she was given another role in Eto na ang susunod na kabanata with Roderick Paulate. In 2003, she starred as Jericho Rosales' sister in the phenomenal hit Sana'y Wala Nang Wakas. Later that year, she also played alongside comedy queen Ai-Ai de las Alas in the hit movie and sitcom Ang Tanging Ina. Afterwards, she did additional movies and eventually her last show Spirits with other teen contract stars of Star Magic.

She announced her retirement from show business in 2004. She has returned in showbiz from her retirement and has included in the casts of Ang Tanging Ina Ninyong Lahat and Ang Tanging Ina Mo (Last na 'To!).

Filmography

Film

Television

Awards and nominations

Personal life 
Dalrymple has two sisters, Sarah and Samantha. Her maternal ancestors come from the southern province of Cebu; her grandmother and other relatives are buried there.  Her father died of a heart attack when she was five, while her mother became ill with pneumonia and died as well five years later, in 2000. After her mother's death, she was raised by an uncle. Outside of show business, she is also interested in skateboarding with her sister Samantha. Fellow actress Shaina Magdayao is one of her best friends.

References

External links

1990 births
Living people
De La Salle–College of Saint Benilde alumni
Filipino child actresses
Filipino women comedians
Filipino film actresses
Filipino people of American descent
Filipino people of Scottish descent
Filipino television actresses
Hult International Business School alumni
Star Magic

la:Serena Dalrymplius
pl:Serena Gail Dalrymple
ru:Дэлримпла, Серена